Lee Hong-nae (born January 28, 1990) is a South Korean actor.

Early life 
Lee was born and raised in Yangsan, Gyeongsang-do, where he completed his elementary, middle school and high school. During his high school years, he worked part-time for a delivery service.

Lee graduated from the Catholic University of Pusan with a degree in public administration.

After completing university, Lee moved to Seoul at 19 years old and ventured to modeling at 20. Due to his lack of height, he only had a few stints in fashion shows and mainly worked for magazines. After not seeing much traction in his modeling career, he initially planned to pursue a career in the military due to his interest in war movies but after fulfilling his mandatory military service, Lee decided that becoming a soldier was not for him.

Career 
Fascinated with movies since he was young, Lee chose to pursue a career in the film industry and jumped into acting despite not attending acting school or getting any formal training. Lee cited models-turned-actors Kim Woo-bin and Jang Mi-kwan as his inspiration to make the leap from modeling to acting.

Lee made his acting debut in the movie Fire in Hell in 2014. To support himself as he pursued a career as an actor, Lee worked part-time jobs in construction and cosmetology.

Lee made his acting breakthrough in the TV series The Uncanny Counter for his portrayal of the villain character from which he won his first acting accolade, receiving the Scene Stealer Award for the male actor category at the 2021 Brand Customer Loyalty Award organized by the Korea Consumer Forum.

After playing minor and supporting roles in various films and TV series for seven years, Lee landed his first main role in the independent movie Made On The Rooftop. For his performance, he was named Best New Actor at the 41st Korean Association of Film Critics Awards.

Filmography

Film

Television series

Web series

Awards and nominations

References

External links 

Lee Hong-nae at KoreanFilm.or.kr

1990 births
Living people
People from Yangsan
South Korean television actors
South Korean film actors
21st-century South Korean actors
Best New Actor Paeksang Arts Award (film) winners